In Hinduism, the Karanodaka or the Garbhodaka, also referred to as the Causal Ocean, is the origin of material creation. It is the place in the spiritual sky where Mahavishnu lies down and creates the material world. The Causal Ocean is the border between the spiritual and material worlds.

Literature 
The Bhagavata Purana offers the following details regarding the Causal Ocean:

The above text also talks about this ocean with regards to the hiranyagarbha, the golden cosmic egg of creation:

Mahavishnu is described to lie down in the Causal Ocean. The water of the Causal Ocean is also referred to as the Karana Ocean, and is regarded as wholly spiritual since it originated from the body of Mahavishnu. The sacred Ganga is mentioned to have its source from this ocean, stated as the reason for its purifying effect. Balarama is described to expand into the great serpent known as Shesha. He is stated to repose on the Causal Ocean. He serves as the bed upon whom Vishnu reclines. The serpent is also stated to serve as the deity's paraphernalia, including such items as the umbrella, slippers, bedding, pillow, garments, resting chair, residence, the sacred gayatri thread, as well as his throne. During the time of creation, after Vishnu is described to have been sleeping for a while, the first emanations from the breathing of this deity are the personifications of the Vedas, who awake him from his slumber.

The Dashavatara Stotram mentions the Garbhodaka ocean:

See also 
 Garbhodaksayi Vishnu

Notes

References 

Hindu cosmology
Locations in Hindu mythology